The Northern Illinois Big 12 Conference was a high-school athletic conference with ten high schools in northern Illinois. The conference began competing during the 2010–2011 academic year and dissolved following the 2018–2019 academic year. In many respects, including membership and organization, the NI-Big 12 was much like a reboot of the old North Central Illinois Conference (NCIC). Six of the schools were former members of the North Central Illinois Conference (1929-2011), and the conference was divided into two divisions, much as the NCIC was for decades.  The former NCIC schools were Geneseo, LaSalle-Peru, Sterling, Ottawa, and Rochelle. Also, there were five schools that were members of the Western Sun Conference (2007-2010).  The former Western Sun Schools are DeKalb, Kaneland, Sycamore, Yorkville, and Rochelle, which left the NCIC in 2007 to join the WSC, and was thus a member of both extinct conferences.

The creation of the new conference appeared to have settled an unstable situation that existed in the NCIC since the departure of the Rochelle Hubs after winning nine consecutive NCIC (Southwest Div.) football championships.  When Rochelle became a founding member of the Western Sun, the NCIC began shifting members trying to keep together a conference that was built of schools with inordinately large population variances.  Whereas the NCIC schools had not all played in the same division in football for several decades, all the schools of the NIB-12 do play in the same division in all sports, regardless of the number of classes.

The NIB-12 essentially consisted of the largest of the former NCIC's schools, with the smallest schools being replaced by Rochelle's new rivals from the Western Sun.  The average enrollment of the NIB-12 schools in the 2014–15 school year was 1210, with the largest school being Yorkville (1650) and the smallest being Geneseo (832).

In 2013, both Dixon and Streator chose to leave the NIB-12. Streator was burdened by the greatest traveling distances in the conference, and Dixon simply proved too weak to be able to compete. With the two Western Division schools leaving, Rochelle was moved from the Eastern division to the Western, leaving both divisions with five teams.

All NIB-12 high schools are members of the Illinois High School Association (IHSA).

Members

East division

West division

References

External links
Northern Illinois Big 12 official website
Illinois High School Association (IHSA) official website

Illinois high school sports conferences
Education in DeKalb County, Illinois
Education in Grundy County, Illinois
Education in Henry County, Illinois
Education in Kane County, Illinois
Education in Kendall County, Illinois
Education in LaSalle County, Illinois
Education in Lee County, Illinois
Education in Livingston County, Illinois
Education in Ogle County, Illinois
Education in Whiteside County, Illinois
2010 establishments in Illinois
2018 disestablishments in Illinois